Ahmed Mostafa may refer to:

 Ahmed Mostafa (footballer, born 1940) (1940–2022), Egyptian defender and midfielder
 Ahmed Mostafa (footballer, born 1987), Egyptian attacking midfielder
 Ahmed Mostafa (footballer, born 1997), Egyptian winger
 Ahmed Sayed (born 1996), Ahmed Mostafa Mohamed Sayed, Egyptian football winger
 Ahmed Rady Mostafa (born 1993), Egyptian trampolinist at the 2015 Trampoline World Championships